The first season of Bachelor in Paradise Australia premiered on 25 March 2018.

Contestants
The first batch of contestants were revealed on 25 March 2018, but only 14 contestants were confirmed. An additional 14 contestants, including four international contestants, have been revealed, resulting in 28 contestants.

Elimination table

Color Key
 The contestant is male.
 The contestant is female.
 The contestant went on a date and gave out a rose at the rose ceremony.
 The contestant went on a date and received a rose at the rose ceremony.
 The contestant gave or received a rose at the rose ceremony, thus remaining in the competition.
 The contestant received the last rose.
 The contestant went on a date and received the last rose.
 The contestant returned, went on a date and gave out a rose.
 The contestant went on a date and was eliminated.
 The contestant was eliminated. 
 The contestant returned and was eliminated.
 The contestant had a date and voluntarily left the show.
 The contestant voluntarily left the show.
 The couple left the show together but later split.
 The couple broke up and were eliminated.
 The couple decided to stay together, but split after Bachelor in Paradise Australia ended.
 The couple decided to stay together and won the competition.
 The couple was engaged, but split after Bachelor in Paradise Australia ended.

Notes

Episodes

Ratings

References

External links 
 

2018 Australian television seasons
Australian (season 01)